Noorda atripalpalis is a moth in the family Crambidae. It was described by Zerny in 1917. It is found in Sudan.

References

Moths described in 1917
Crambidae